Portugal Cove–St. Philip's is a rural seashore community located on the eastern Avalon Peninsula of Newfoundland in the province of Newfoundland and Labrador, Canada. The town is a bedroom community of the provincial capital of St. John's.

The provincial government operates a daily ferry service from Portugal Cove–St. Philip's to Bell Island.

Geography
Located less than 15 minutes' drive from the provincial capital of St. John's, and covering , it borders the City of St. John's to the east, and the Town of Paradise to the west. Located on Conception Bay, it is the site of a ferry terminal which provides daily access to and from Bell Island, and dozens of people commute from this tiny island to work in and around the capital city, daily. The town motto is Where the Sun Meets the Sea.

Demographics 

In 2011, the town’s population has a median age of 39.5 years, which is slightly lower than the provincial median of 40.6 years.

History

The community is one of the oldest in Newfoundland and has a rich history. It was founded by the Portuguese and was one of the first villages established in the New World. The Portugal Cove area has historically been predominantly Roman Catholic. The Roman Catholic population was served by Holy Rosary Church until it closed in 2022.

It was attacked and burned by the French in 1696, was the site of the first road built outside the capital St. John's, it was also here that the giant squid or kraken of legend was discovered and documented. The community has a large body of folklore and oral traditions. Settled by fishermen from the West Country of England and Ireland it also has a small settler tradition from Jersey in the Channel Islands. It is named after Portugal. Fishing had been a mainstay since the 17th century and this has been on the downswing since the 1990s.

Notable people
 Marlene Creates (artist)
 Emma Churchill (Emma Dawson), founder of The Salvation Army in Newfoundland
 Craig Dobbin, chairman and chief executive officer of CHC Helicopter Corporation
 Andrew Furey, 14th Premier of Newfoundland and Labrador
 Ed Picco, Nunavut MLA

References

External links

Portugal Cove–St. Philip's official site
Portugal Cove – Encyclopedia of Newfoundland and Labrador, Vol. 4, pp. 408–409.
St. Phillip's – Encyclopedia of Newfoundland and Labrador, Vol. 5, pp. 49–50.

Populated coastal places in Canada
Portuguese-Canadian culture
Towns in Newfoundland and Labrador
1992 establishments in Canada